Natanson is a surname. It may refer to:

Isidor Natanson (1906–1964), Swiss-born Soviet mathematician
Jacques Natanson (1901–1975), French playwright and screenwriter
Jakub Natanson (1832-1884), Polish chemist and banker
Mark Natanson  (1850 [N.S. 1851]–1919), Russian-Jewish revolutionary
Władysław Natanson (1864–1937), Polish physicist

See also
 Nathanson